Luis Mayoral Rubin (born 7 February 1937) is a Spanish former professional cyclist. He was professional from 1957 until 1965. He notably rode in the 1962 and 1963 Vuelta a España.

Biography
Luis Mayoral was born in Gijón, Spain on February 7, 1937. He competed with the Faema-Flandria team during 1960s. Luis Mayoral competed in the Trofeo Jaumendreu race in 1962. He retired from cycling in 1965.

Career
His cycling career spanned 8 seasons, from 1957 to 1965, in which he obtained a total of 5 victories. He also competed in the Gran Premio de Catalunya road race in 1963. He took 5th place in vaux gold tankard road race in 1962, which was held in United Kingdom. His best result was 4th in a stage in at the 1961 Volta a Catalunya.

References

External links
 

1937 births
Living people
Spanish male cyclists
Sportspeople from Gijón
Volta a Catalunya cyclists
Cyclists from Asturias